Norman Hadley (2 December 1964 – 26 March 2016) was a Canadian rugby union player. "Stormin' Norman" was a massive ,  lock. He played professionally first for London Wasps and then Bedford Blues in the 1990s. In Canada he played for James Bay and UBCOB Ravens (British Columbia Rugby Union).  He earned an M.B.A. degree from UBC in 1991. He also played for Western Suburbs in Wellington, New Zealand. He earned 15 caps for Canada between 1987 and 1994, and was part of the team that reached the quarter-final of the 1991 Rugby World Cup.

Career
Hadley captained his national side five times in 1992–3, including on 17 October 1992 at Wembley Stadium, a 26–13 loss to England.  On that day Hadley eclipsed his English counterparts Wade Dooley and Martin Bayfield, and rallied an understrength Canadian side to a respectable outcome. Many however point to Canada's narrow quarter-final defeat to the New Zealand All Blacks in the 1991 World Cup as Canada's finest hour, where Hadley and a big, tough forward pack clearly had the upper hand over New Zealand. That highly regarded 1991 Canadian team made a big impact defeating Fiji and Romania and giving both France and New Zealand difficult games.  Always outspoken, a dispute with national team management saw him not play the 1995 World Cup, where his team desperately needed him in a tough pool that included South Africa and Australia.

Following a dominant performance in the 1991 World Cup, he was named to the World Team (as selected by Rugby World magazine), and was subsequently chosen to play for the Barbarians against the World Cup winners Australia at Twickenham in 1992.  His locking partner for the Barbarians that day was All Black Ian Jones.  He went on to represent the Barbarians another four times.  He was named Athlete of the Year in his hometown of Victoria, British Columbia following the World Cup in 1991.

While working in London and playing for Wasps, he gained perhaps his greatest notoriety for roughing up two hooligans on the London Underground, an act which not only earned him praiseworthy column inches in the British broadsheets and tabloids, but even gained him a mention in the House of Commons by then Prime Minister John Major.  Already a well-known pundit on BBC TV's Rugby Special weekly program, offers for more TV appearances followed.

Hadley has one daughter, Madison Elle Watson. He was the grandson of celebrated Academy Award-winning cinematographer Osmond Borradaile.

At the age of 51, after many years of battling depression, chronic pain and suspected Chronic Traumatic Encephalopathy (CTE), Hadley ended his life on 19 March 2016. The Tokyo Medical Examiner determined the cause to be an overdose of Pentobarbital. His death was announced on 27 March 2016

References

External links
Wasps Tribute to-Stormin' Norm Hadley
Wasps profile
London Wasps Squad 1995/1996

1964 births
2016 deaths
Barbarian F.C. players
Canadian expatriate sportspeople in Japan
Canadian expatriate sportspeople in England
Canadian expatriate sportspeople in New Zealand
Canadian rugby union players
Wasps RFC players
Bedford Blues players
Sportspeople from Winnipeg
Canada international rugby union players
German expatriate rugby union players
Rugby union locks